Yakima Valley College (YVC) is a public college in Yakima, Washington. It was founded as Yakima Valley Community College in 1928 with Elizabeth Prior serving as the institution's first president. The college offers 5 Bachelor of Applied Science degree programs, 55 associate degree programs, and more than 100 certificates of achievement.

The main campus is located at S. 16th Ave. and Nob Hill Boulevard in Yakima. There also is a campus in Grandview, and learning centers in Toppenish, Sunnyside and Ellensburg.

History
Yakima Valley College was founded in 1928 as Yakima Valley Junior College when the Yakima School District decided to create a junior college. The school became the third junior college in Washington state when it opened on September 17, 1928. The college's first classes were taught at Yakima's Columbia School building and had its first graduating class in 1930.

In 1937, the college obtained land donated by the family of Yakima businessman A.E. Larson. The first building on the college's new campus was dedicated in 1949 and named after its first president, Elizabeth Prior. Prior Hall featured classrooms, administrative offices, a small bookstore and hall for assemblies along with music practice rooms.

Academics
YVC offers programs in lower division arts and sciences, professional and technical education, adult basic education, English Language Acquisition and continuing education. Offerings include five bachelor of applied science degrees, 55 associate degrees and 100+ certificates of achievement. The college also offers Running Start, a program that enables eligible high school juniors and seniors in Washington state the opportunity to enroll in YVC classes and receive both high school and college credit with no tuition cost.

Campus
Yakima Valley College has two campuses: the Yakima Campus at S. 16th Ave. and Nob Hill Boulevard in Yakima and the Grandview Campus at 500 W. Main Street in Grandview. The Yakima Campus consists of 26 buildings as well as baseball, softball and soccer fields. The Grandview Campus consists of four buildings including the joint City of Grandview/YVC Library.

In January 2021, Yakima Valley College opened West Campus — a $22.7 million project that includes learning spaces for the college's allied health programs, Larson Gallery, a tasting room for the college's teaching winery (Yakima Valley Vintners) and a conference center.

Athletics
Yakima Valley College competes in the Northwest Athletic Conference (NWAC) as the Yaks, fielding men's teams for baseball, women's teams for soccer, softball and volleyball and men's and women's teams for basketball. The men's basketball team won the 2022 NWAC Championship.

Notable alumni 

 MarJon Beauchamp, professional basketball player for the Milwaukee Bucks of the National Basketball Association (NBA).

References

External links
 

Community colleges in Washington (state)
Educational institutions established in 1928
Universities and colleges accredited by the Northwest Commission on Colleges and Universities
Education in Yakima County, Washington
Buildings and structures in Yakima, Washington
1928 establishments in Washington (state)